Barrientosiimonas humi is a bacterium from the genus Barrientosiimonas which has been isolated from soil from the Barrientos Island in the Antarctica.

References

 

Micrococcales
Bacteria described in 2013